Carlos Martínez Aguirre (born 1974, in Madrid) is a Spanish poet and classical scholar.
He is graduated in Classical Philology. He has been a Spanish teacher in the Cervantes Institute of Athens and a research student in the Institute of Byzantine Studies in the same city. He was nominated for the Hyperion Prize for Poetry in 1997.

He is best known for his poems La camarera del cine Doré y otros poemas (1997), El peregrino (2014), El significado de las lágrimas (2020) and his autobiographical essay about the didactics of Classical Languages A Strange Odyssey. Confessions of a Classicist (2013).

He is the son of writer Antonio Martínez Menchén, grandson of painter Lorenzo Aguirre, nephew of poet Francisca Aguirre and writer Andrés Sorel, and a cousin of poet Guadalupe Grande.

References 

1974 births
Living people
Spanish poets